Dangerously in Love is the debut solo studio album by American singer Beyoncé. It was released on June 20, 2003, by Columbia Records and Music World Entertainment.

During the recording of Destiny's Child's third studio album Survivor (2001), the group announced that each member would produce solo albums. Recording sessions for Dangerously in Love took place from March 2002 to March 2003 at various recording studios, during the group's hiatus. As the executive producer of the album, Beyoncé took a wider role in its production, co-writing a majority of the songs, choosing which ones to produce and sharing ideas on mixing and mastering. Although she remained discreet about her interpretation of the album's songs, their underlying meanings were attributed by media outlets as an allusion to her intimate relationship with rapper Jay-Z. Musically, the album is a mixture of uptempo tracks and ballads, all of which are primarily R&B songs, while also incorporating elements of soul, hip hop and Arabic music.

Upon its release, Dangerously in Love received generally positive reviews from music critics, many of whom praised Beyoncé's "artistic leap". An international commercial success, it debuted atop the US Billboard 200, selling 317,000 copies in its first week and earning Beyoncé the highest debut-week sales among Destiny's Child members' solo albums. At the 46th Annual Grammy Awards (2004), the album and its songs won five awards, including Best Contemporary R&B Album; Beyoncé consequently tied with Lauryn Hill, Alicia Keys and Norah Jones for the record of most Grammy Awards won by a woman at a single ceremony. Dangerously in Love has been certified sextuple platinum by the Recording Industry Association of America (RIAA) and, as of 2011, has sold over 11 million copies worldwide.

Dangerously in Love produced four singles. "Crazy in Love" spent eight consecutive weeks atop the US Billboard Hot 100, reaching the top ten almost everywhere it charted and winning two Grammy Awards. "Baby Boy" replicated the international commercial success of "Crazy in Love" while outlasting it atop the Billboard Hot 100 by one week. "Me, Myself and I" peaked at number four on the Billboard Hot 100 while attaining lower peaks than its predecessors internationally. "Naughty Girl" peaked at number three on the Billboard Hot 100 and within the top ten in several additional countries. Beyoncé promoted the album via numerous live performances and two concert tours–Dangerously in Love Tour (2003) and Verizon Ladies First Tour (2004), the latter of which was co-headlined with Alicia Keys and Missy Elliott, while the former produced the live album Live at Wembley (2004).

Background and development 
Beyoncé launched her career as the lead singer in the R&B girl group Destiny's Child in the late 1990s. According to Corey Moss of MTV News, "fans [were] eager to see" how Beyoncé, after years with the group, performs solo. While recording their third album Survivor in late 2000, Beyoncé announced the group would be put on hiatus in order for the members to produce solo albums in the coming years, which they hoped would boost interest in Destiny's Child. The idea of individual releases emanated from the group's manager and Beyoncé's father Mathew Knowles. With different musical styles for each member to produce, the albums were not intended to compete on the charts. Destiny's Child's management strategically planned to stagger the release of each group member's album to maximize sales.

Michelle Williams was the first to release a debut solo album, titled Heart to Yours, in April 2002. Meanwhile, Beyoncé had her film debut in the comedy film Austin Powers in Goldmember, and recorded her debut single "Work It Out", which was featured on the film's soundtrack. Rowland collaborated with American rapper Nelly on the song "Dilemma" (2002) as a featured artist; it became a US Billboard Hot 100 number-one hit, leading the label to advance the release date of her debut solo album Simply Deep to October. Beyoncé additionally starred in The Fighting Temptations (2003) and recorded another solo single. In August 2002, she collaborated with her now-husband Jay-Z as a featured vocalist on his song "'03 Bonnie & Clyde". Peaking at number four on the Billboard Hot 100, the song earned Beyoncé credibility as a solo artist and paved the way for the release of Dangerously in Love.

Recording and production 

Before Beyoncé began recording for Dangerously in Love, she selected the producers with whom she would collaborate. For two days, she held meetings with prospective producers from the West Coast across the East Coast, and had interviews with them. Beyoncé went to Miami to begin sessions with record producer Scott Storch, her first collaborator, and lived in a hotel in the following months. As she wanted to concentrate on the album, Beyoncé took her time to avoid pressure build-up, significantly different from the hasty productions of Destiny's Child's albums. Beyoncé felt that recording an album without her groupmates was "liberating and therapeutic", coming into the studio and freely expressing her ideas with her collaborators. The dependency she developed with Destiny's Child, however, meant it was harder "to be on [her] own creatively". As she wanted to grow as an artist, Beyoncé contacted other artists with a view to forming a collaborative partnership. When the collective finished writing several songs, she printed copies of each and sent them to prospective guest artists. She talked to them by phone for possible collaboration, eventually gaining their approval. Besides Jay-Z, Beyoncé was able to work with Jamaican artist Sean Paul and American rapper Missy Elliott, among others. In contrast, some artists sent copies of songs to Beyoncé, which were eventually produced. Beyoncé also worked with Elliott and Timbaland on a track titled "Wrapped Around Me", but it ultimately failed to appear on the album.

Survivor included a track titled "Dangerously in Love", which was deemed too sophisticated compared to other tracks on the album, and Destiny's Child decided not to release it as a single. After recording several tracks for Dangerously in Love, Beyoncé decided to re-record and add the track, retitling it "Dangerously in Love 2", after realizing that it fit the overriding theme of her album. As she did on Survivor, Beyoncé took a wider role in the production of Dangerously in Love, co-writing a majority of the songs, choosing which ones to produce and sharing ideas on the mixing and mastering of tracks. Although Beyoncé did not create beats, she came up with melodies and ideas she shared with the producers. Since the album's release date was postponed so Columbia Records could capitalize on the success of Kelly Rowland's feature on Nelly's "Dilemma", Beyoncé had been offered the chance to further enhance the record. Although she was disappointed with the decision, Beyoncé realized that "everything happens for a reason", agreeing to return to the recording studio to work with other songwriters. This allowed her to record more songs, including the album's lead single "Crazy in Love". In late 2002, Beyoncé paused working on Dangerously in Love in favor of a holiday tour with Destiny's Child. With a few weeks left for recording in March 2003, Beyoncé was still collaborating with other guests on the album, including Sean Paul and P. Diddy. The latter contributed on "Summertime", which ultimately did not make the album's final cut. However, it was later sent to radio stations and received favorable response. Consequently, Beyoncé planned to release a follow-up album comprising leftover tracks from Dangerously in Love, as the creative output of its sessions left several tracks ready for another album pressing. With 43 songs completed, Beyoncé is credited as a co-writer and a co-producer, as well as the album's executive producer alongside her father and then-manager Mathew Knowles.

Music and lyrics 

Beyoncé's father and then-manager Mathew Knowles said Dangerously in Love showcased her musical roots. While Williams and Rowland explored on gospel and alternative pop styles, respectively, Beyoncé focused on recording R&B songs. The album's tracks vary, ranging from mid-tempo and club-oriented tracks on the first half, to ballads on the second half. Beyoncé commented: "My album is a good balance of ... ballads and ... mid-tempos with just ridin'-in-your-car feels, to a lot of ... up-tempo club songs, to really sexy songs, to songs that make you feel emotional. It's a nice mixture of different types of tracks." Although it contains high-energy tracks such as "Crazy in Love" and "Naughty Girl", the album's focal mode, however, is slow and moody. Beyoncé said she had mainly written ballads for the album. She added that she wanted to be understood as an artist and showcase her range, and by doing so, she blended various genres and musical influences; consequently, the album incorporates R&B, hip hop, soul, reggae and Arabic music influences. Its hip hop influences came from Jay-Z, Outkast, and Lil' Kim, while the reggae influences came from Sean Paul. Additionally, Scott Storch's personal study of Arabic music gave the album a Middle Eastern vibe. Beyoncé and the producers also used a wide array of instrumentations.

Lyrically, love was the theme Beyoncé had incorporated for Dangerously in Love the most. Surrounding the release of the album, there were persistent rumors of her relationship with Jay-Z, which would later be proven true. Though "most the material is vague enough to be about any relationship", the album consists multiple tracks suggesting affirmation of their relationship. On "Signs", Beyoncé sings about being in love with a Sagittarius, Jay-Z's zodiac sign. Beyoncé said the album was lyrically similar to Destiny's Child's albums. However, since she had to write only for herself, Beyoncé had the chance to compose personally deeper songs than previous records with the group. With a theme based upon different stages of a romantic relationship, the album contains tracks speaking of romance and honesty. In addition, Beyoncé admitted some address sex. The personal content of the album, however, was not generally attributed to Beyoncé's own experiences—although some songs were—instead, the theme kept recurring in her mind. Beyoncé later explained: "I wanted to have an album that everyone could relate to and would listen to as long as I'm alive and even after... Love is something that never goes out of style. It's something everybody experiences, and if they are not in love, people usually want to feel that..." While some songs merely focus on the "beauty of love", the album also explores another side of love, with songs that "celebrate breakup" and songs that narrate a woman's desire to have a degree of control in a relationship. The album's hidden track "Daddy" is a tribute to Mathew Knowles, being an account of Beyoncé wanting her future husband and child to possess qualities similar to her father's. Originally, Beyoncé did not intend to include the track on the album, having thought its lyrics would make her appear immature. However, considering it one of the songs that reflected her life at that transitional moment, she relegated "Daddy" as the closing track.

Title and artwork
Dangerously in Love was titled after a track of the same title from Destiny's Child's third studio album Survivor (2001), which Beyoncé re-recorded for the album. The song itself is lyrically about being romantically obsessed, as indicated in the chorus: "I am in love with you / You set me free / I can't do this thing called life without you here with me". When "'03 Bonnie & Clyde" was released as a single in October 2002, critics and the public had speculated that Beyoncé and Jay-Z were having a mutual affair. Despite widespread rumors, they remained silent about their relationship. According to critics, the album's title sounded "more intriguing" with Beyoncé singing personal songs. Though love was the theme Beyoncé had incorporated in the album, "most the material is vague enough to be about any relationship"; some tracks, however, alluded to the accuracy of the rumors. In response to the rumors allegedly echoed in the album's title, Beyoncé stated: "People can come to whatever conclusion they like... That's the beauty of music... I'm a singer, I'll talk about writing songs all you want. But when it comes to certain personal things any normal person wouldn't tell people they don't know, I just feel like I don't have to [talk about it]."

Beyoncé approached photographer Markus Klinko and asked for a diamond-themed portrait to be used as the cover artwork for Dangerously in Love, referencing his 2000 campaign for Diamond.com showing Laetitia Casta lying on diamond-studded spider web. Her mother and stylist Tina Knowles brought a rhinestone top designer Jose Barrera had repurposed from a pair of pants he designed for Cher, which she wore for her 1990 photoshoot for Vanity Fair; the top has since been included in a Rock and Roll Hall of Fame exhibition dedicated to Beyoncé. Beyoncé, however, initially refused to wear the top since only skirts were available for the outfit's bottom half. In order to capture the diamond theme regardless, Klinko lent Beyoncé his Dolce & Gabbana jeans to wear with the top, as shown on the final cover. Klinko retrospectively stated: "That famous pose she struck, with her arms out, she just did that. I didn't tell her to do that. They knew what they were doing. I just captured it."

Release and promotion 

Beyoncé said she had trouble convincing executives at Columbia Records to release Dangerously in Love. She recounted that it was almost not released: "In 2003, I had my first solo album. But when I played it through for my record label, they told me I didn't have one hit on my album. I guess they were kinda right, I had five–"Dangerously in Love", "Naughty Girl", "Me, Myself and I", "Baby Boy" and "Crazy in Love"." Since Kelly Rowland's "Dilemma" was concurrently charting atop the US Billboard Hot 100, Beyoncé's management released "Work It Out", one of the songs on the soundtrack to Austin Powers in Goldmember, instead of a single from Dangerously in Love to preclude it from possibly competing with "Dilemma". Dangerously in Love was consequently pushed back from its original October 2002 release date to December, and then to May 2003. Beyoncé recorded a cover version of 50 Cent's "In Da Club", which served its way to mixtapes before the original release date. The song failed to dominate as a "dancefloor favorite"; Mathew Knowles, however, confirmed that it was just a "buzz cut" and was not included on the album. Nonetheless, it earned enough airplay to chart on the US Hot R&B/Hip-Hop Songs. While Beyoncé was completing the album, several of its tracks had leaked online. In an effort to prevent more tracks from the album being spread illegally, as well as being a victim of bootlegging, Columbia Records, with high commercial expectations from the album, pulled the release of Dangerously in Love to June 24, two weeks ahead of the planned July 8 release.

Buyers who pre-ordered Dangerously in Love via Sony Music's online store received links where they could download a song titled "I Can't Take No More"; the offer lasted until the album's release. On June 14, Beyoncé premiered songs from the album during her first solo concert and the pay-per-view television special titled Ford Presents Beyoncé Knowles, Friends & Family, Live From Ford's 100th Anniversary Celebration in Dearborn, Michigan. By the night of the album's release, Beyoncé's concert was broadcast in over 20 theaters across the United States. Rowland, Michelle Williams, Tyrese and Beyoncé's younger sister Solange also performed during the show. Beyoncé also promoted the album by performing on television shows such as Saturday Night Live, Late Show with David Letterman, Today, The Early Show, and The View. She further promoted it with her Dangerously in Love Tour in November 2003, performing in the United Kingdom, Ireland and the Netherlands. Her concert at Wembley Arena in London on November 10, was filmed for her live album Live at Wembley, released on April 26, 2004. Additionally, Beyoncé co-headlined the Verizon Ladies First Tour with Alicia Keys and Missy Elliott across the US from March to April.

Singles 

In April 2003, Columbia Records was choosing the lead single from Dangerously in Love between two songs. Sent to clubs, the song that would receive better reception would be selected as the lead single. Finally, "Crazy in Love" was released as the lead single on May 14, 2003. It was lauded by critics who described it as "deliriously catchy". The single topped the US Billboard Hot 100, based on heavy rotation alone. The same week the song reached number one, Dangerously in Love topped the Billboard 200 as well. The substantial airplay and later retail sales of "Crazy in Love" facilitated it to dominate the chart, subsequently spending eight straight weeks atop the Billboard Hot 100, making it Beyoncé's first number-one single in her solo career. According to Nielsen SoundScan, "Crazy in Love" was the most downloaded song in the United States for four consecutive weeks in July 2003. The digital single was certified sextuple platinum by the Recording Industry Association of America (RIAA). The song also became a success internationally, reaching the top of the charts in Croatia, Ireland and the United Kingdom. At the 46th Annual Grammy Awards (2004), the song won  Best R&B Song and  Best Rap/Sung Collaboration. Its Jake Nava-directed accompanying music video "celebrates the evolution of a woman. It is about a girl who is at the point of a relationship. She realizes that she is in love, she is doing stuff she would not normally do but she does not care. It does not matter she is just crazy in love." Critically acclaimed, the video won Best Female Video, Best R&B Video and Best Choreography in a Video at the 2003 MTV Video Music Awards.

"Baby Boy" was released as the second single from Dangerously in Love on August 3, 2003. It was well received by critics, who declared it a "high-profile collaboration" which "bridges the gap between the genres of R&B and dancehall." It ultimately peaked atop the US Billboard Hot 100 eight weeks after its debut, and stayed there for nine consecutive weeks, surpassing the eight-week run atop the chart of "Crazy in Love". The digital single was certified platinum by the RIAA. Internationally, the song peaked at number two on the UK Singles Chart, reaching the top ten in 15 additional countries. Its accompanying music video, Beyoncé's second consecutive to be directed by Nava, features Beyoncé performing the song infused with heavy choreography at a flooded party and on a Miami beach, among other sceneries.

"Me, Myself and I" was released as the third single from Dangerously in Love on October 19, 2003. It received generally positive critical response, directed towards its production and Beyoncé's vocal performance. It peaked at number four on the US Billboard Hot 100, and reached the top ten in Canada. The digital single was certified platinum by the RIAA. However, the song failed to replicate its predecessors' international commercial success, reaching the top 20 in Australia, the Netherlands, New Zealand and the United Kingdom. Its Johan Renck-directed accompanying music video shows events of Beyoncé dealing with an adulterous boyfriend in reverse. Critically acclaimed, the video was nominated for Best R&B Video at the 2004 MTV Video Music Awards.

"Naughty Girl" was released as the fourth and final single from Dangerously in Love on March 14, 2004. The song was lauded by critics, who noted that "Beyoncé borrowed a portion of Donna Summer's naughty classic "Love to Love You Baby" to create this celebration of sensual naughtiness." It peaked at number three on the US Billboard Hot 100, continuing Beyoncé's string of top-five singles on the chart. The digital single was certified platinum by the RIAA. Internationally, the song became a top-ten hit in Australia, Canada, the Netherlands, New Zealand and the United Kingdom. Despite "Me, Myself and I" and "Naughty Girl" not peaking atop the Billboard Hot 100, they still achieved high commercial success and helped Dangerously in Love reach a multi-platinum status. The accompanying music video for "Naughty Girl" was directed by Nava and features Beyoncé seductively dancing and flirting with Usher. The Studio 54-styled video was inspired by the dancing of Cyd Charisse and Fred Astaire in the 1953 musical comedy film The Band Wagon. Critically acclaimed, it won Best Female Video at the 2004 MTV Video Music Awards.

Leading up to the release of Dangerously in Love, "Daddy" was released as a promotional single via iTunes Store on June 3, 2003. Beyoncé and Luther Vandross' cover of Roberta Flack and Donny Hathaway's "The Closer I Get to You" was released as the fourth and final single from Vandross' thirteenth and final studio album Dance with My Father on June 13, 2004. Having won Best R&B Performance by a Duo or Group with Vocals at the 46th Annual Grammy Awards, the song peaked at number 62 on the US Hot R&B/Hip-Hop Songs. Despite never being released as a single, "Dangerously in Love 2" won Best Female R&B Vocal Performance at the 46th Annual Grammy Awards, and peaked at number 57 on the US Billboard Hot 100. Its mastertone was certified gold by the RIAA.

Critical reception 

Dangerously in Love received generally positive reviews from music critics. At Metacritic, which assigns a normalized rating out of 100 to reviews from mainstream critics, the album received an average score of 63, based on 17 reviews, indicating "generally favorable reviews". Anthony DeCurtis of Rolling Stone viewed that it presents Beyoncé in two styles, one "far more flattering" than the other, and found the ballad-oriented songs on the album least flattering, commenting that Beyoncé has "plenty of time" to develop the style maturely that would "[make] sense for her". Entertainment Weeklys Neil Drumming commented that the album validates Beyoncé's "taste in innovation". He also viewed that Beyoncé's collaboration with various record producers explores new directions in contemporary music, doing more reinventing than revisiting. Like DeCurtis' review, however, Drumming pointed out that "most of the disc's missteps" are in its latter part. Slant Magazines Sal Cinquemani wrote that "[Beyoncé] is allowed more room to experiment vocally as a solo artist, exploring softer registers and lathering on the coquettish persona that was only hinted at on Destiny's Child tracks like 'Bootylicious.'". Steve Jones of USA Today stated, "Beyoncé succeeds by showing greater depth as a songwriter and broader range as a singer". Blenders Ben Ratliff complimented Beyoncé's performance and stated, "She's playing the cool-hunter but covering the bases with seraphic arrangements of multiple voices. Her reach is remarkable". Mark Anthony Neal of PopMatters called it an "artistic leap" and wrote that it "finds Ms. B in the midst of a fully flowering womanhood and doing the best singing of her career".

In a mixed review, Vibes Jason King said Dangerously in Love occasionally "sounds desperate to reach every demographic". Kelefa Sanneh, writing for The New York Times, felt that the album missed the harmonies of Destiny's Child records and that Beyoncé was more effective "when she's got a posse behind her". Rob Fitzpatrick of NME called it "a cruel glimpse of a talent that occasionally blazes but is frustratingly inconsistent". Uncut called its ballads "self-pitying/self-mythologising", while Q stated: "She has good songs, but no great songs". Los Angeles Times writer Natalie Nichols expressed that it "demonstrates vocal finesse [...] But, especially on the ballads, [Beyoncé] often drags things out with diva acrobatics". The Guardians Adam Sweeting wrote that "the desperate urge to cover every musical base from dancefloor to soul-ballad means that there is barely a track here with any distinctive identity or even a tune". In his consumer guide for The Village Voice, Robert Christgau cited "Yes" and "Baby Boy" as the album's highlights and quipped that the artist was "Dangerously in Love ... with her daddy, the bonus cut reveals—as if we didn't know." He gave the album a one-star honorable mention, indicating "a worthy effort consumers attuned to its overriding aesthetic or individual vision may well like." In a retrospective review, AllMusic editor Stephen Thomas Erlewine commented that "the first half is good enough to make Dangerously in Love one of the best mainstream urban R&B records released in 2003, and makes a strong case that Beyoncé might be better off fulfilling this destiny instead of reuniting with Destiny".

Accolades

Awards and nominations

|-
! scope="row" rowspan="2"| 2003
| rowspan="2"| Teen Choice Award
| Choice Music – Love Song
| rowspan="8"| "Crazy in Love"
| 
| rowspan="2"| 
|-
| Choice Music – Summer Song
| 
|-
! scope="row" rowspan="4"| 2003
| rowspan="4"| MTV Video Music Award
| Best Female Video
| 
| rowspan="4"| 
|-
| Best R&B Video
| 
|-
| Best Choreography in a Video
| 
|-
| Viewer's Choice
| 
|-
! scope="row" rowspan="3"| 2003
| rowspan="3"| MOBO Award
| Best Single
| 
| rowspan="3"| 
|-
| Best Video
| 
|-
| Best Album
| Dangerously in Love
| 
|-
! scope="row"| 2003
| MTV Europe Music Award
| Best Song
| "Crazy in Love"
| 
| 
|-
! scope="row"| 2003
| American Music Award
| Favorite Soul/R&B Album
| Dangerously in Love
| 
| 
|-
! scope="row" rowspan="3"| 2003
| rowspan="2"| Vibe Award
| Coolest Collaboration
| rowspan="3"| "Crazy in Love"
| 
| rowspan="2"| 
|-
| Reelest Video
| 
|-
| colspan="2"| The Record of the Year
| 
| 
|-
! scope="row"| 2003
| Billboard Music Award
| Hot 100 Award for Most Weeks at No. 1
| 
| 
| 
|-
! scope="row"| 2003
| Smash Hits Poll Winners Party
| Best Music Video
| rowspan="2"| "Crazy in Love"
| 
| 
|-
! scope="row"| 2004
| RTHK International Pop Poll Award
| Top Ten International Gold Songs
| 
| 
|-
! scope="row" rowspan="6"| 2004
| rowspan="6"| Grammy Award
| Best Contemporary R&B Album
| Dangerously in Love
| 
| rowspan="6"| 
|-
| Record of the Year
| rowspan="3"| "Crazy in Love"
| 
|-
| Best R&B Song
| 
|-
| Best Rap/Sung Collaboration
| 
|-
| Best Female R&B Vocal Performance
| "Dangerously in Love 2"
| 
|-
| Best R&B Performance by a Duo or Group with Vocals
| "The Closer I Get to You"
| 
|-
! scope="row"| 2004
| Brit Award
| International Album
| Dangerously in Love
| 
| 
|-
! scope="row" rowspan="2"| 2004
| rowspan="2"| NAACP Image Award
| Outstanding Song
| rowspan="5"| "Crazy in Love"
| 
| rowspan="2"| 
|-
| Outstanding Music Video
| 
|-
! scope="row" rowspan="3"| 2004
| rowspan="2"| Space Shower Music Award
| Best International Video
| 
| rowspan="2"| 
|-
| Best International Female Video
| 
|-
| International Dance Music Award
| Best R&B/Urban Dance Track
| 
| 
|-
! scope="row" rowspan="4"| 2004
| rowspan="4"| Soul Train Music Award
| Best Album of the Year
| rowspan="2"| Dangerously in Love
| 
| rowspan="4"| 
|-
| Best R&B/Soul Album – Female
| 
|-
| Best R&B/Soul Single – Female
| rowspan="8"| "Crazy in Love"
| 
|-
| The Michael Jackson Award for Best R&B/Soul or Rap Music Video
| 
|-
! scope="row"| 2004
| Porin Award
| Best Foreign Song
| 
| 
|-
! scope="row"| 2004
| Nickelodeon Kids' Choice Award
| Favorite Song
| 
| 
|-
! scope="row"| 2004
| ASCAP Pop Music Award
| Most Performed Songs
| 
| 
|-
! scope="row" rowspan="2"| 2004
| rowspan="2"| MTV Video Music Award Japan
| Best Female Video
| 
| rowspan="2"| 
|-
| Best Collaboration
| 
|-
! scope="row"| 2004
| MuchMusic Video Award
| Best International Artist Video
| 
| 
|-
! scope="row"| 2004
| ASCAP Rhythm & Soul Music Award
| Award-Winning R&B/Hip-Hop Songs
| 
| 
| 
|-
! scope="row" rowspan="3"| 2004
| rowspan="3"| BET Award
| Video of the Year
| rowspan="3"| "Crazy in Love"
| 
| rowspan="3"| 
|-
| Best Collaboration
| 
|-
| Viewer's Choice Award
| 
|-
! scope="row"| 2004
| Billboard R&B/Hip-Hop Award
| Top R&B/Hip-Hop Album
| rowspan="2"| Dangerously in Love
| 
| 
|-
! scope="row" rowspan="3"| 2004
| rowspan="3"| Teen Choice Award
| Choice Music – Album
| 
| rowspan="3"| 
|-
| Choice Music – Single
| "Baby Boy"
| 
|-
| Choice Music – R&B Track
| rowspan="5"| "Naughty Girl"
| 
|-
! scope="row" rowspan="5"| 2004
| rowspan="5"| MTV Video Music Award
| Best Female Video
| 
| rowspan="5"| 
|-
| Best Dance Video
| 
|-
| Best Cinematography in a Video
| 
|-
| Best Choreography in a Video
| 
|-
| Best R&B Video
| "Me, Myself and I"
| 
|-
! scope="row"| 2004
| MTV Video Music Brazil
| Best International Video
| "Baby Boy"
| 
| 
|-
! scope="row" rowspan="2"| 2004
| rowspan="2"| TEC Award
| Outstanding Creative Achievement – Record Production/Album
| Dangerously in Love
| 
| rowspan="2"| 
|-
| Outstanding Creative Achievement – Record Production/Single
| "Crazy in Love"
| 
|-
! scope="row"| 2004
| MTV Europe Music Award
| Best Album
| Dangerously in Love
| 
| 
|-
! scope="row" rowspan="3"| 2004
| rowspan="2"| Vibe Award
| Best R&B Video
| rowspan="2"| "Me, Myself and I"
| 
| rowspan="2"| 
|-
| Reelest Video
| 
|-
| CASH Golden Sail Most Performed Works Award
| Best English Pop Work
| "Crazy in Love"
| 
| 
|-
! scope="row"| 2005
| RTHK International Pop Poll Award
| Top Ten International Gold Songs
| rowspan="2"| "Naughty Girl"
| 
| 
|-
! scope="row" rowspan="2"| 2005
| rowspan="2"| Soul Train Music Award
| Best R&B/Soul Single – Female
| 
| rowspan="2"| 
|-
| Best R&B/Soul Single – Group, Band or Duo
| "The Closer I Get to You"
| 
|-
! scope="row" rowspan="2"| 2005
| rowspan="2"| MTV Australia Video Music Award
| Best R&B Video
| rowspan="2"| "Naughty Girl"
| 
| rowspan="2"| 
|-
| Sexiest Video
| 
|-
! scope="row" rowspan="3"| 2005
| ASCAP Pop Music Award
| Most Performed Songs
| 
| 
| 
|-
| ASCAP Rhythm & Soul Music Award
| Award-Winning R&B/Soul Songs
| "Me, Myself and I"
| 
| 
|-
| colspan="2"| Telecom New Zealand Award
| "Naughty Girl"
| 
| 
|}

Listings

Commercial performance 
In the United States, Dangerously in Love debuted atop the Billboard 200 chart dated July 12, 2003, with first-week sales of 317,000 copies according to Nielsen SoundScan. Although its first-week sales failed to match those of Survivor (2001), which sold 663,000 copies, Beyoncé registered the highest single-week sales among Destiny's Child members' solo albums: Kelly Rowland's Simply Deep sold 77,000 copies in its first week, while Michelle Williams' Heart to Yours sold 17,000 copies in its strongest week. Beyoncé became the first female artist and the fifth artist ever to simultaneously top both the single–with "Crazy in Love"–and album charts in the US and the United Kingdom, following the Beatles, Simon & Garfunkel, Rod Stewart and Men at Work. In its second week, the album registered a 42-percent sales decrease to 183,000 copies, descending to number two behind Ashanti's Chapter II. It remained behind Chapter II at number two in its third week, selling 132,000 copies. The album has been certified sextuple platinum by the Recording Industry Association of America (RIAA). It remains Beyoncé's best-selling album in the country to date, with cumulative sales of five million copies as of June 2016. In Canada, the album debuted atop the Canadian Albums Chart, spending a total of 13 weeks charting. It has since been certified triple platinum by Music Canada.

Across Europe, Dangerously in Love reached the summit in Germany, Greece, Iceland, Ireland and Norway, also peaking atop the European Top 100 Albums. In November 2003, it was certified platinum by the International Federation of the Phonographic Industry (IFPI) for sales of one million copies across Europe. By July 2011, the album had sold over 1,143,000 copies in the UK, being certified quadruple platinum by the British Phonographic Industry (BPI). In Australia, the album debuted at number three on the ARIA Top 100 Albums, ascending to its peak at number two the following week. It eventually went on to be certified triple platinum by the Australian Recording Industry Association (ARIA). In New Zealand, the album debuted at number 14, peaking at number eight in its second week. It was later certified platinum by the Recording Industry Association of New Zealand (RIANZ). In Japan, the album peaked at number 12 on the Oricon Albums Chart, being certified gold by the Recording Industry Association of Japan (RIAJ). As of 2011, Dangerously in Love has sold over 11 million copies worldwide.

Impact and legacy 

With the release of Dangerously in Love and the combined commercial success of its singles, Beyoncé had established herself as a viable solo artist. Rebecca Louie of the New York Daily News wrote that the success of Dangerously in Love brought Beyoncé into a "sultry solo star" who "blossomed from a girly group", referring to Destiny's Child. The album also facilitated her to become one of the most marketable artists in the industry. She appeared on the cover of numerous magazines, guested television shows for promotions, and signed lucrative commercial deals. In 2003, she signed a contract with the conglomerate beverage manufacturer PepsiCo, and appeared on several television commercials for its products within the next ten years. The album's success also incited the public to infer that it signalled the disbandment of Destiny's Child, as pop singer Justin Timberlake "could not go back to 'N Sync after tasting solo success". However, Beyoncé said that their side projects were only "a brief diversion in the juggernaut that has become Destiny's Child".

As time did not permit, Beyoncé's solo aspirations–which included a follow-up album to Dangerously in Love composed of its unreleased tracks–were put on hiatus for her to concentrate on her Super Bowl XXXVIII performance, wherein she was slated to sing the US national anthem "The Star-Spangled Banner", as well as the recording of Destiny's Child's fourth studio album Destiny Fulfilled (2004). Destiny Fulfilled would also become their final album, as the group ultimately disbanded in 2006. Following the disbandment, Beyoncé recorded her second studio album B'Day, which was released on September 4, 2006, her 25th birthday. The album became her second to debut atop the US Billboard 200, with first-week sales of 541,000 units, which exceeded those of Dangerously in Love. Despite the album's first two singles' average commercial performance—neither of which reached the summit of the US Billboard Hot 100—its "handsome debut" was noted by Keith Caulfield of Billboard as having been generated "by goodwill earned from the performance of [Beyoncé's] smash first album Dangerously in Love."

Track listing 

Notes
 signifies an additional vocal producer
 signifies a co-producer
 signifies a vocal producer

Sample credits
 "Crazy in Love" contains samples from "Are You My Woman (Tell Me So)" by the Chi-Lites
 "Naughty Girl" contains interpolations from "Love to Love You Baby" by Donna Summer
 "Baby Boy" contains uncredited interpolations from "Hot Stepper" by Ini Kamoze
 "Be with You" contains interpolations from "I'd Rather Be with You" by Bootsy's Rubber Band, excerpts from "Strawberry Letter 23" by Shuggie Otis and an uncredited sample from "Ain't Nothing I Can Do" by Tyrone Davis
 "That's How You Like It" contains resung lyrics from "I Like It" by DeBarge
 "Gift from Virgo" is "inspired by" "Rainy Day" by Shuggie Otis
 "'03 Bonnie & Clyde" contains interpolations from "If I Was Your Girlfriend" by Prince and samples from "Me and My Girlfriend" by 2Pac
 "What's It Gonna Be" contains samples from "Do It Roger" by Roger Troutman

Personnel 
Credits are adapted from the liner notes of Dangerously in Love.

 Nat Adderley, Jr. – arrangement (track 11), electric piano (track 11), production (track 11), string arrangements (track 11)
 Tawatha Agee – backing vocals (track 11)
 Vincent Alexander – additional engineering (track 4)
 Sanford Allen – concertmastering
 Chuckie Amos – hair styling
 Skip Anderson – additional keyboards (track 11), arrangement (track 11), programming (track 11)
 Delroy "D-Roy" Andrews – production (track 10), songwriting (track 10)
 Ray Bardani – mixing (track 11), string engineering (track 11)
 Sherrod Barnes – production (track 9), songwriting (track 9)
 Mark Batson – additional instrumentation (track 15), conducting (track 15), engineering (track 15), production (track 15), songwriting (track 15), string arrangements (track 15)
 Carlos "El Loco" Bedoya – engineering (tracks 2, 3, 6, 8, 9 and 13), vocal engineering (track 7)
 Pete Bellotte – songwriting (track 2)
 Angela Beyincé – songwriting (tracks 2, 5 and 9)
 Beyoncé – executive production, production (tracks 1–10 and 12–15), songwriting (tracks 1–7, 9, 10 and 12–15), vocal production (track 8), vocals (all tracks)
 Big Boi – additional vocal production (track 4), songwriting (track 4), vocals (track 4)
 Kevin Bird – prop styling
 Brian Bridgeman – songwriting (track 10)
 Craig Brockman – production (track 8), songwriting (track 8)
 John "Jab" Broussard – additional guitars (track 12)
 Al Brown – string contracting (track 11)
 Dan Bucchi – mixing assistance (track 9)
 Chris Carmouche – additional engineering (track 4)
 Jim Caruana – engineering (tracks 1, 5 and 8)
 Demacio "Demo" Castellon – mixing assistance (track 8)
 George Clinton, Jr. – songwriting (track 5)
 William Collins – songwriting (track 5)
 Gary Cooper – songwriting (track 5)
 Tom Coyne – mastering (all tracks)
 Ian Cuttler – art direction
 Dahlen – photography
 Jason Dale – mixing assistance (track 7)
 Makeda Davis – songwriting (track 4)
 Eldra DeBarge – songwriting (track 10)
 Randy DeBarge – songwriting (track 10)
 Missy Elliott – production (track 8), songwriting (track 8), vocals (track 8)
 Focus... – engineering (track 7), instrumentation (track 7), production (track 7), songwriting (track 7)
 Guru – engineering (tracks 4 and 10)
 Phil Hamilton – guitar (track 11)
 Ivan Hampden Jr. – drums (track 11)
 Rich Harrison – instrumentation (tracks 1 and 5), production (tracks 1 and 5), songwriting (tracks 1 and 5)
 Andreao "Fanatic" Heard – production (track 9), songwriting (track 9)
 Cissy Houston – backing vocals (track 11)
 James Hunter – graphic design
 Indrani – photography
 Jay-Z – songwriting (tracks 1, 3, 4, 7 and 10), vocals (tracks 1 and 10)
 Bashiri Johnson – percussion (track 11)
 Etterlene Jordan – songwriting (track 10)
 Scott Kieklak – mixing (track 8)
 Markus Klinko – photography
 Mathew Knowles – executive production
 Tina Knowles – styling
 Brendan Kuntz – mixing assistance (track 14)
 Reggie Lucas – songwriting (track 11)
 Tony Maserati – mixing (tracks 1–7, 9, 10, 14 and 15)
 Errol "Poppi" McCalla, Jr. – production (track 12), songwriting (track 12)
 Byron Miller – bass (track 11)
 Giorgio Moroder – songwriting (track 2)
 Mr. B – production (track 10)
 James Mtume – songwriting (track 11)
 Shuggie Otis – songwriting (tracks 5 and 14)
 Sean Paul – songwriting (track 3), vocals (track 3)
 Greg Price – mixing assistance (tracks 2, 3 and 6)
 Eugene Record – songwriting (track 1)
 Mally Roncal – make-up
 Dexter Simmons – mixing (track 12)
 Sleepy Brown – vocals (track 4)
 Matt Snedecor – mixing assistance (tracks 9 and 14)
 Brian Springer – engineering (track 12)
 Nisan Stewart – production (track 8), songwriting (track 8)
 Scott Storch – production (tracks 2, 3 and 6), songwriting (tracks 2, 3 and 6)
 Donna Summer – songwriting (track 2)
 Candace Thomas – backing vocals (track 11)
 Pat Thrall – engineering (tracks 1 and 3)
 Luther Vandross – vocal arrangement (track 11), vocals (track 11)
 Luz Vasquez – mixing assistance (tracks 1–6 and 10)
 Stan Wallace – engineering (track 11)
 Robert Waller – songwriting (tracks 2, 3 and 6)
 Brenda White-King – backing vocals (track 11)
 Teresa LaBarbera Whites – A&R
 Bryce Wilson – production (track 4), songwriting (track 4)
 Pat Woodward – mixing assistance (tracks 1, 4–6 and 10)
 Dan Workman – engineering (track 12), guitars (track 12)

Charts

Weekly charts

Monthly charts

Year-end charts

Decade-end charts

All-time charts

Certifications

Release history

See also 
Beyoncé discography
List of Billboard 200 number-one albums of 2003
List of Billboard number-one R&B albums of 2003
List of number-one albums of 2003 (Canada)
List of number-one hits of 2003 (Germany)
List of number-one albums of 2003 (Ireland)
List of UK Albums Chart number ones of the 2000s
List of UK R&B Albums Chart number ones of 2003
List of best-selling albums of the 21st century
List of best-selling albums by women
Grammy Award for Best Contemporary R&B Album

Notes

References

Bibliography

External links 
 Official website
 
 Dangerously in Love at Metacritic

2003 debut albums
Albums produced by Craig Brockman
Albums produced by Focus...
Albums produced by Mark Batson
Albums produced by Missy Elliott
Albums produced by Rich Harrison
Albums produced by Scott Storch
Beyoncé albums
Columbia Records albums
Grammy Award for Best Contemporary R&B Album
Albums produced by Beyoncé